Revue d'histoire diplomatique (Journal of Diplomatic History) is a journal of the Société d'histoire diplomatique in France. It was established in 1887 and covers French and foreign diplomatic history and international relations.

References 

Publications established in 1887
International relations journals
French-language journals